The 2009 Saskatchewan Roughriders season was the 52nd season for the team in the Canadian Football League. The Roughriders attempted to win their 4th Grey Cup championship but lost to the Alouettes in the Grey Cup final.

During the 2009 Grey Cup on the second last play of the game, Sean Lucas of the Saskatchewan Roughriders, lined up as a slot back, behind a defensive linesman, during the missed kick attempt by Montreal. With 11 players already on the defensive line, and with 1 player, Jason Armstead, in the end-zone to return any missed kicks, Sean Lucas, a defensive linebacker, was on the field as a defender, & therefore, the 13th man on the field, causing the penalty on the play, and providing Montreal with another opportunity to win the 2009 Grey Cup.

The Roughriders finished the season in first place for the first time since 1976 and finished with a 10–7–1 record. As of the 2019 CFL season, the 2009 season marks the first of only two instances since 1976 that the Roughriders won their division and hosted the West Final as a member team of the CFL. They most recently won the Western Division crown during the 2019 season.

Off-season

CFL draft
The 2009 CFL Draft took place on May 2, 2009. Due to a series of trades, the Roughriders had only two draft picks. Both were selected from the local University of Regina Rams team.

Preseason

Regular season

Standings

Season schedule

Roster

Notable Transactions

Player stats

Passing

Rushing

Receiving

Awards

CFL All-Star Selections
 John Chick, Defensive End
 Gene Makowsky, Offensive Guard
 Jeremy O'Day, Centre

CFL West All-Star Selections
 Stevie Baggs, Defensive End
 John Chick, Defensive End
 Weston Dressler, Receiver
 Darian Durant, Quarterback
 Lance Frazier, Defensive Back
 Tad Kornegay, Linebacker
 Sean Lucas, Linebacker
 Gene Makowsky, Offensive Guard
 Jeremy O'Day, Centre

Playoffs

Schedule

Bracket

*=Team won in Overtime.

West Final
Date and time: Sunday, November 22, 4:30 PM Mountain Standard TimeVenue: Mosaic Stadium, Regina, Saskatchewan

References

Saskatchewan Roughriders Season, 2009
Saskatchewan Roughriders seasons